Atletico Marte is a professional football club based in San Salvador, El Salvador. The club was formed in 1950 as Alacranes F.C., and played their first competitive match in October 1950. The club was renamed Atletico Marte in 1951,

From the beginning of the club's official managerial records in 1950 to the start of the 2021–22 season, Atletico Marte have had TBD full-time managers. The current manager is Salvadoran Omar Sevilla , who took over from argentinian Osvaldo Escudero in March 2023.

The most successful person to manage Atletico Marte is Conrado Miranda and Armando Contreras Palma, who won 3 Primera division titles.

Managers 
Only first-team competitive matches are counted. 
Statistics are updated up to 19 August 2022.

Table key
 
 

List of Head Coaches of Atlético Marte from when the club was formed:

By number of trophies
Only managers who have won at least one trophy are mentioned.

External links
http://www.elsalvador.com/enlajugada/13edicion/nota2.html

Atlético Marte
Atletico Marte